Helendje is a village on the island of Grande Comore (Ngazidja) in the Comoros. According to the 2021 census, the village had a population of 21000.

References

Populated places in Grande Comore